The Subzi Mandi Delhi railway station is a railway station in the Indian National Capital Territory of Delhi. It serves Subzi Mandi, Pratap Nagar and surrounding areas. Pratap Nagar metro station of Red Line (Delhi Metro) is at a walking distance from Subzi Mandi railway station. So one can go to Karol Bagh, Kamla Nagar, ISBT Kashmere Gate, Sadar Bazaar, Shakti Nagar, Gulabi Bagh, Shashtri Nagar, InderLok, if you want to go Rewari, Rohtak side, then two railway stations are also there, Delhi Kishanganj & Delhi Sarai Rohilla; you can pay only 10 rupees from e-rickshaw outside of Subzi Mandi.

References

Railway stations in Central Delhi district